Cecryphalus nubila is a moth in the family Cossidae. It is found in Mongolia, Turkey, Armenia, Kazakhstan, Kyrgyzstan, Uzbekistan, Tajikistan, Azerbaijan, Turkmenistan, southern Iran and China.

References

Natural History Museum Lepidoptera generic names catalog

Zeuzerinae